Amit Das (born 7 September 1989) is an Indian first-class cricketer who played for Tripura.

References

External links
 

1989 births
Living people
Indian cricketers
Odisha cricketers
Cricketers from Tripura
People from Sipahijala district